Toxidia inornatus, is a butterfly of the family Hesperiidae. The common name for this species is spotless grass-skipper or inornata skipper.

It is found in Indonesia (Papua, Aru Islands, Kai Islands), New Guinea, Australia's Cape York and surrounding islands.

The wingspan is about 25 mm.

The larvae feed on Poaceae species, including Brachiaria reptans. They live in the debris at the foot of its host plant or in a shelter of leaves joined with silk.

Subspecies
Toxidia inornatus inornatus  (Butler, 1883)  (Aru Islands, Kei Islands, Queensland)
Toxidia inornatus sekara (Plötz, 1885) (New Guinea)
?Toxidia inornatus anga Evans 1949

References

External links
Australian Insects
Australian Faunal Directory

Trapezitinae
Butterflies described in 1883
Butterflies of Indonesia
Taxa named by Arthur Gardiner Butler